Teagan Croft (born 23 April 2004) is an Australian actress. She stars as Rachel Roth on the DC Universe / HBO Max superhero series Titans (2018–present) and also portrayed the title character in the 2016 science fiction film The Osiris Child.

Career
Croft's career began when she played the part of Scout Finch in a theatrical adaptation of To Kill a Mockingbird when she was nine years old. She garnered enough attention to land the lead role in the 2016 film The Osiris Child. That same year, Croft had a recurring role as Bella Loneragan in Home and Away. In August 2017, she was cast as the DC Comics character Raven in the DC Universe series Titans, which premiered on 12 October 2018.

Croft stars in the movie True Spirit alongside Anna Paquin and Cliff Curtis. It was aired on Netflix in February 2023. The movie is based on the journey of Jessica Watson, an Australian sailor attempting solo global circumnavigation at 16 years-old.

Personal life
Croft has two sisters. Her family relocated to Chicago in 2016. She is the niece of actresses Penny and Jessica McNamee.

Filmography

Theatre
 To Kill a Mockingbird (2014), as Scout Finch

References

External links

Living people
Australian child actresses
Australian stage actresses
21st-century Australian actresses
Australian film actresses
Australian television actresses
Place of birth missing (living people)
2004 births